Li Yi, Li-yi or Liyi may refer to:

 Li Yi (poet) (746/748–827/829), Tang dynasty poet
 Emperor Xuānzong of Tang (810–859), name Li Yi, Chinese emperor of the Tang Dynasty
 Hermengild Li Yi (1923–2012), Chinese Roman Catholic bishop
 Li Yi (sociologist) (born 1961), Chinese sociologist 
 Li Yi (footballer) (born 1979), Chinese football player and coach
 Yi Li (basketball) (born 1987), Chinese basketball player
 Li Yi (wushu) (born 1992), Macau wushu practitioner
 Li Yi (voice actor) (1963–2013), Chinese voice actor and announcer
 Li Yi (composer), the Singapore film composer who worked on Homerun and I Not Stupid
 Liyi, a former country of the Fergana, a substate of Kangju
 Liyi, a set of Traditional Chinese law practices
 Liyi, a township in Shanxi, see List of township-level divisions of Shanxi